Qeshlaq-e Chukhli Quyi Hajj Hasan Ali (also Romanized as Qeshlāq-e Chūkhlī Qūyī Ḩājj Ḩasan ʿAlī) is a village in Qeshlaq-e Gharbi Rural District, Aslan Duz District, Parsabad County, Ardabil Province, Iran. At the 2006 census, its population was 129, in 24 families.

References 

Towns and villages in Parsabad County